Yarbrough and Peoples were an American urban contemporary duo from Dallas, Texas, United States. The duo’s biggest-selling release was "Don't Stop the Music," a US Billboard R&B chart topper in 1981.

Career
Cavin Leon Yarbrough (born January 22, 1954) and Alisa Delois Peoples (born June 29, 1957) both grew up in Dallas, Texas, having known each other since they were young children, as they had met taking piano lessons, after which they remained friends throughout their childhoods.

In the mid-1970s, Yarbrough was on tour with Leon Russell’s band and met the Wilson Brothers, who went on to form the Gap Band. Upon returning to Dallas, the twosome started the band Grand Theft, both as featured keyboardists as well as vocalists. In 1977, the Wilson Brothers had just joined Total Experience Records (which was at that point a production company) as the Gap Band and went down to Dallas to perform a concert. Later that night, trying to unwind after the show, the Wilsons caught the twosome's act, and as a result, Lonnie Simmons (President of Total Experience) invited the couple to Los Angeles where they began playing in clubs around Southern California.

Two years later, they signed their own recording contract with Total Experience and recorded and released their debut album, The Two of Us, which contained "Don't Stop the Music," topping the US Billboard R&B chart in early 1981, knocking their label-mate's song "Burn Rubber on Me (Why You Wanna Hurt Me)" out of the top spot. The song went on to chart higher on the Billboard Hot 100 than any of the other songs released on the label up to that time. In addition, the corresponding album went Gold and peaked at #16 in the Billboard Hot 200 album chart. Across the pond in Europe, the UK release of the song reached #7 in the UK Singles Chart and was certified Silver.

The duo continued on with its R&B success throughout the 1980s, with four more top 10 R&B hits: "Heartbeats" (R&B #10 in 1983), "Don't Waste Your Time" (Pop #48, R&B #1 in 1984; #60 UK), "Guilty" (R&B #2 in 1986; #53 UK), and "I Wouldn't Lie" (R&B #6 in 1986; #61 UK), all of which brought the band success. After Guilty, its final album for Total Experience/RCA, Yarbrough and Peoples left the label in 1986.

They married in 1987, and returned to their hometown of Dallas and started their own music production company, Yarbrough & Peoples Productions.

In 2009, they both appeared in the Off-Broadway musical Blind Lemon Blues at the York Theater in New York, where Cavin Yarbrough portrayed Lead Belly.

The duo was featured on an episode of TV One's Unsung on September 2, 2015.

Discography

Studio albums

Compilation albums
The Best of Yarbrough & Peoples (1997, Chronicles/Mercury/PolyGram Records)

Singles

References

African-American musical groups
American contemporary R&B musical groups
American dance music groups
American boogie musicians
Mercury Records artists
American musical duos
People from Dallas
Musicians from Dallas
Musical groups from Dallas